José Antonio Domínguez Bandera (born 10 August 1960), known professionally as Antonio Banderas, is a Spanish actor and director. Known for his work in films of several genres, he has received various accolades, including a Cannes Film Festival Award and a European Film Award, in addition to nominations for an Academy Award, a Tony Award, two Primetime Emmy Awards, and five Golden Globe Awards.

Banderas made his film debut in Pedro Almodóvar's screwball comedy Labyrinth of Passion (1982). They've since collaborated together on many films including Matador (1986), Law of Desire (1987), Women on the Verge of a Nervous Breakdown (1988), Tie Me Up! Tie Me Down! (1989), and The Skin I Live In (2011). For the 2019 film Pain and Glory, Banderas earned various accolades for Best Actor including the Cannes Film Festival Award, Goya Award, and as well as nominations from the Academy Awards and Golden Globe Awards.

He's also known for several Hollywood films, such as Philadelphia (1993), Interview with the Vampire (1994), Desperado (1995), Assassins (1995), Evita (1996), and The Mask of Zorro (1998). He also appeared in the first three films of the Spy Kids series (2001-2003) and provided the voice of Puss in Boots in the Shrek franchise (2004–present) and its spin-off films Puss in Boots (2011) and Puss in Boots: The Last Wish (2022).

In 2003, Banderas made his US theatre debut as Guido Contini in Nine, for which he was nominated for a Tony Award and won a Drama Desk Award. He received Primetime Emmy Award nominations for his roles in the television film And Starring Pancho Villa as Himself (2004) and the second season of Genius (2018); his portrayal of Pablo Picasso in the latter garnered him critical praise.

Early life 
José Antonio Domínguez Bandera was born on 10 August 1960 in Málaga, to Civil Guard gendarme officer José Domínguez Prieto (1920–2008) and schoolteacher Ana Bandera Gallego (1933–2017). He has a younger brother named Francisco. As a little boy, Banderas wanted to become a professional football player until a broken foot sidelined his dreams at the age of 15. He showed a strong interest in the performing arts and formed part of the ARA Theatre-School run by Ángeles Rubio-Argüelles y Alessandri (wife of diplomat and filmmaker Edgar Neville) and the College of Dramatic Art, both in Málaga. His work in the theater and his performances on the streets eventually landed him a spot with the Spanish National Theatre.

Career

1980s 
Banderas began his acting studies at the School of Dramatic Art in Málaga, and made his acting debut at a small theatre in Málaga. He was arrested by the Spanish police for performing in a play by Bertolt Brecht, because of political censorship under the rule of General Francisco Franco. Banderas spent a whole night at the police station; he had three or four such arrests while he was working with a small theatre troupe that toured all over Spain and was giving performances in small town theatres and on the street. Banderas began working in small shops during Spain's post-dictatorial cultural movement known as the La Movida Madrileña.

While performing with the theatre, Banderas caught the attention of Spanish director Pedro Almodóvar, who gave the young actor his film debut in Labyrinth of Passion. Five years later, he went on to appear in the director's Law of Desire (1987), making headlines with his performance as a gay man, which required him to engage in his first male-to-male onscreen kiss. After Banderas appeared in Almodóvar's 1986 Matador, the director cast him in his internationally acclaimed 1988 film, Women on the Verge of a Nervous Breakdown. The recognition Banderas gained for his role increased, years later, when he starred in Almodóvar's controversial Tie Me Up! Tie Me Down! (1989) as a mental patient who kidnaps a porn star (Victoria Abril) and keeps her tied up until she returns his love. His breakthrough role in Tie Me Up! Tie Me Down! helped spur him on to Hollywood. Almodóvar is credited for helping launch Banderas's international career, as he became a regular feature in his films throughout the 1980s.

1990s 

In 1991, Madonna introduced Banderas to Hollywood. (He was an object of her desires in her pseudodocumentary film of one of her concert tours, Madonna: Truth or Dare.) The following year, still speaking minimal English, he began acting in U.S. films. Despite having to learn all his lines phonetically, Banderas still managed to turn in a critically praised performance as a struggling musician in his first American drama film, The Mambo Kings (1992).

Banderas then broke through to mainstream American audiences in the Jonathan Demme film Philadelphia (1993), as the life-long partner of lawyer Andrew Beckett (Tom Hanks), who has AIDS. The film's success earned Banderas wide recognition, and the following year, he was given a role in Neil Jordan's high-profile adaptation of Anne Rice's Interview with the Vampire (1994), sharing the screen with Brad Pitt, Tom Cruise, and Kirsten Dunst. He appeared in several major Hollywood releases in 1995, including a starring role in the Robert Rodriguez-directed film Desperado and the antagonist on the action film Assassins, co-starred with Sylvester Stallone. In 1996, he starred alongside Madonna in Evita, an adaptation of the musical by Andrew Lloyd Webber and Tim Rice in which he played the narrator, Che, a role played by David Essex in the original 1978 West End production. He also had success with his role as the masked swordsman Zorro in the 1998 film The Mask of Zorro starring Anthony Hopkins and Catherine Zeta-Jones. In 1999, he starred in The 13th Warrior, a movie about a Muslim caught up in a war between the Northman and human eating beasts.

2000s 

In 2001, he collaborated with Robert Rodriguez who cast him in the Spy Kids film trilogy. He also starred in Michael Cristofer's Original Sin alongside Angelina Jolie the same year. In 2002, he starred in Brian De Palma's Femme Fatale opposite Rebecca Romijn and in Julie Taymor's Frida with Salma Hayek. In 2003, he starred in the last installment of the trilogy Once Upon a Time in Mexico (in which he appeared with Johnny Depp and Hayek). Banderas' debut as a director was the poorly received Crazy in Alabama (1999), starring his then wife Melanie Griffith.

In 2003, he returned to the musical genre, appearing to great acclaim in the Broadway revival of Maury Yeston's musical Nine, based on the film 8½, playing the prime role originated by Raul Julia. Banderas won both the Outer Critics Circle and Drama Desk awards, and was nominated for the Tony Award for best actor in a musical. His performance is preserved on the Broadway cast recording released by PS Classics. Later that year, he received the Rita Moreno HOLA Award for Excellence from the Hispanic Organization of Latin Actors (HOLA).

Banderas' voice role as Puss in Boots in Shrek 2, Shrek the Third, and the last film in the Shrek franchise, Shrek Forever After, helped make the character popular on the family film circuit. In 2005, he reprised his role as Zorro in The Legend of Zorro, though this was not as successful as The Mask of Zorro. In 2006, he starred in Take the Lead, a high-set movie in which he played a ballroom dancing teacher. That year, he directed his second film, El camino de los ingleses, based on the novel by Antonio Soler and also received the L.A. Latino International Film Festival's "Gabi" Lifetime Achievement Award on 14 October.

He received a star on the Hollywood Walk of Fame in 2005, the 2,294th person to do so; his star is located on the north side of the 6800 block of Hollywood Boulevard.

2010s 

In 2011, the horror thriller The Skin I Live In marked the return of Banderas to Pedro Almodóvar, the Spanish director who launched his international career. The two had not worked together since 1990 (Tie Me Up! Tie Me Down!). In The Skin I Live In he breaks out of the "Latin Lover" mold from his Hollywood work and stars as a calculating revenge-seeking plastic surgeon following the rape of his daughter. According to the Associated Press Banderas' performance is among his strongest in recent memory. He again lent his voice to Puss in Boots, this time as the protagonist of the Shrek spin-off prequel, Puss in Boots. This film reunited Banderas with Salma Hayek for the sixth time.

In 2018, Banderas starred in the National Geographic limited series Genius: Picasso, as the noted sculptor and painter Pablo Picasso. For his performance he received a Primetime Emmy Award, Screen Actors Guild Award, and Golden Globe Award nomination. He also starred in the ensemble drama Life Itself (2018) which premiered at the Toronto International Film Festival.

In 2019, Banderas starred in the Spanish film Pain and Glory (Dolor y gloria), directed by Pedro Almodóvar.
The film centers around an aging film director, played by Banderas who has a chronic illness and writer's block as he reflects on his life in flashbacks to his childhood. The film has been described as semi-autobiographical, according to Almodóvar. The film premiered at the 2019 Cannes Film Festival to critical acclaim. On 25 May 2019, Banderas won Cannes Film Festival Award for Best Actor for his role in the film. He was later nominated for his first ever Academy Award for Best Actor in a Leading Role for Pain and Glory. Also in 2019, Banderas starred in Steven Soderbergh's Netflix film, The Laundromat alongside Meryl Streep, and Gary Oldman.

2020s 
In 2020, he appeared alongside Robert Downey Jr. in the fantasy adventure film Dolittle. In 2022, Banderas appeared as Santiago Moncada, the antagonist of the Uncharted film. In 2023, he is appearing in the Indiana Jones and the Dial of Destiny with Harrison Ford, Mads Mikkelsen and Toby Jones. He also returned to work for DreamWorks Animation reprising his voice as Puss in Boots in the sequel Puss in Boots: The Last Wish. He is also appearing in The Enforcer which filmed in Greece in 2022.

Personal life 
A longtime supporter of Málaga CF, Banderas is also an officer (mayordomo de tronom) of a Roman Catholic religious brotherhood in his hometown of Málaga and travels during Holy Week to take part in the processions, although he once described himself as an agnostic in an interview with People magazine.

In May 2010, Banderas received an honorary doctorate from the University of Málaga. He received an honorary degree from Dickinson College in 2000.

Banderas has always struggled with the pronunciation of certain English words, as he mentioned in a 2011 article with GQ magazine: "The word that really gets me is 'animals', I just can never say it properly, whenever it is in a film I have to get it changed for a synonym. In Zorro, I had a line changed from 'you look like a bunch of animals' to 'you look like a collection of beasts'. It worked much better, so I don't care."

In August 2015, Banderas enrolled in a fashion-design course at Central Saint Martins. As of 2016, Banderas resides in the United Kingdom in Cobham, Surrey.

Relationships 

Banderas married Ana Leza in 1986 or 1988 (sources differ) and divorced in 1996. He met and began a relationship with American actress Melanie Griffith in 1995 while shooting Two Much. They married on 14 May 1996 in London. They have a daughter, Stella del Carmen Banderas (born 24 September 1996), who appeared onscreen with Griffith in Banderas' directorial debut Crazy in Alabama (1999). In 2002, the couple received the Stella Adler Angel Award for their extensive philanthropy. Griffith has a tattoo of Banderas' name on her right arm.

In June 2014, Banderas and Griffith released a statement announcing their intention to divorce "in a loving and friendly manner". According to the petition filed in the Los Angeles Superior Court, the couple had "irreconcilable differences" that led to their separation. The divorce became official in December 2015. Despite being divorced Banderas and Griffith remain close friends. His former stepdaughter Dakota Johnson has stated she considers Banderas part of the family calling him a "bonus dad".

Banderas is currently dating Nicole Kimpel, a "Dutch investment banker." They have made public appearances such as the 2015 AFI Fest, 2019 Cannes International Film Festival, and the 2020 Academy Awards.

Health 
In 2009, Banderas underwent surgery for a benign tumor in his back.

Speaking at the Málaga Film Festival in March 2017, Banderas revealed he had suffered from a heart attack on 26 January 2017, but said it "wasn't serious and hasn't caused any damages". Following that incident, he underwent heart surgery to insert three stents into his arteries. In a Fresh Air interview in September 2019, he recalled it as being life changing. He said, "It just gave me a perspective of who I was, and it just made the important things [go to] the surface. When I say this, people may just think that I'm crazy, but it's one of the best things that ever happened in my life."

Activism 
In 1996, Banderas appeared among other figures of Spanish culture in a video supporting the Spanish Socialist Workers' Party lists in the general election.

In 2013, he called on Europe and the United States to emulate Hugo Chávez in Venezuela and nationalize big corporations as a solution to the global economic crisis.

In June 2015, Banderas demonstrated his support for Israel by taking part in a fund-raising event organized by Friends of the Israeli Defense Forces (FIDF), which raised $31m for Israeli soldiers.

Business activities 

He has invested some of his film earnings in Andalusian products, which he promotes in Spain and the US. He owns 50% of a winery in Villalba de Duero, Burgos, Spain, called Anta Banderas, which produces red and rosé wines.

He performed a voice-over for a computer-animated bee which can be seen in the United States in television commercials for Nasonex, an allergy medication, and was seen in the 2007 Christmas advertising campaign for Marks & Spencer, a British retailer.

He is a veteran of the perfume-industry. The actor has been working with fragrance and beauty multinational company Puig for over ten years becoming one of the brand's most successful representatives. Banderas and Puig have successfully promoted a number of fragrances so far – Diavolo, Diavolo for Women, Mediterraneo, Spirit, and Spirit for Women. After the success of Antonio for Men and Blue Seduction for Men in 2007, he launched his latest Blue Seduction for Women the following year.

Awards and honors

Banderas has received many award nominations throughout his career including an Academy Award nomination for Pain and Glory. He also received five Golden Globe Awards nominations for his work ranging from films to television. He has also received two Primetime Emmy Award nominations for his work on the television projects, And Starring Pancho Villa as Himself (2004), and Genius: Picasso (2018). He also received a Screen Actors Guild Award nomination for his performance as Pablo Picasso in Genius: Picasso. In 2003, he received a Tony Award nomination for Best Actor in a Musical for his performance in the Broadway musical production of Nine. That year he did however win the Drama Desk Award for Outstanding Actor in a Musical for his performance in Nine. In 2019, he won the Cannes Film Festival Award for Best Actor, the European Film Award for Best Actor, the Goya Award for Best Actor, and the New York Film Critics Circle Award for Best Actor for his performance in Almodovar's Pain and Glory.

See also

 List of actors with Hollywood Walk of Fame motion picture stars
 List of celebrities who own wineries and vineyards

References

External links 

 
 Antonio Banderas appointed Goodwill Ambassador at Bay Ledger
 
 
 
 
 

1960 births
Living people
20th-century Spanish male actors
21st-century Spanish male actors
Audiobook narrators
Cannes Film Festival Award for Best Actor winners
Drama Desk Award winners
European Film Award for Best Actor winners
Griffith family
People from Málaga
Spanish businesspeople
Spanish expatriates in the United Kingdom
Spanish expatriates in the United States
Spanish film producers
Spanish male film actors
Spanish male musical theatre actors
Spanish male television actors
Spanish male voice actors
Spanish socialists
Theatre World Award winners